Emoni Narawa (born 13 July 1999 in Fiji) is a Fijian rugby union player who plays for the  in Super Rugby. His playing position is wing. He has signed for the Blues squad in 2020.

Reference list

External links
itsrugby.co.uk profile

1999 births
Fijian rugby union players
Living people
Rugby union wings
People from Suva
Rugby union centres
Bay of Plenty rugby union players
Blues (Super Rugby) players
Chiefs (rugby union) players